Harry Curtis may refer to:

 Harry Curtis (baseball) (1883–1951), catcher in Major League Baseball
 Harry Curtis (football manager) (1890–1966), English football referee and manager
 Harry Curtis (footballer) (1892–1968), Australian rules footballer
 Harry F. Curtis (1871–1939), engineer and Pennsylvania state representative

See also
 Henry Curtis (disambiguation)